Two Crosses at Danger Pass ( and ) is a 1967 Spanish western film directed by Rafael Romero Marchent. It is produced by Eduardo Manzanos Brochero, written by Enzo Battaglia, Eduardo Manzanos and Gianlorenzo Battaglia, and starring Pietro Martellanza, Mario Novelli and Mara Cruz. It is scored by Francesco De Masi.

Cast
 Pietro Martellanza as Alex Mitchell
 Mara Cruz as Judy Mitchell
 Luis Gaspar as Mark
 Anthony Freeman as Charlie Moran
 Miguel S. del Castillo as Powell
 Emilio Rodríguez as Johnny Miller
 Dianik as Gloria Moran
 Eduardo Coutelenq
 Nuccia Cardinali as Edith
 Antonio Pica as Sheriff Doug
 Cris Huertas as Loud Drunk
 Xan das Bolas as Bartender
 Jesús Puente as Sheriff T. Mitchell
 Armando Calvo as Old Moran
 July Ray as Saloon Singer

References

External links
 

1967 films
Spanish Western (genre) films
Films directed by Rafael Romero Marchent
Films produced by Fulvio Lucisano
Films scored by Francesco De Masi
United Pictures Corporation
Films shot in Madrid
Films shot in Rome
1967 Western (genre) films